Carl Wilhelm Wolfgang Ostwald (27 May 1883 – 22 November 1943) was a German chemist and biologist researching colloids.

Ostwald was born in Riga, the son of the 1909 winner of the Nobel Prize in Chemistry, Wilhelm Ostwald, and died in Dresden.

Books
 Grundriß der Kolloidchemie (Basics of colloid chemistry, 1909)
 Die Welt der vernachlässigten Dimensionen (The world of neglected dimensions, 1914)

References

See also
 List of Baltic German scientists

1883 births
1943 deaths
Scientists from Riga
People from the Governorate of Livonia
Baltic-German people
20th-century German chemists
Emigrants from the Russian Empire to Germany